Live V is Isis's fifth live release. This live album is unique for Isis in that it is a soundboard recording taken from a single live performance. The show was performed on July 23, 2006, at Koko's in London for All Tomorrow's Parties' Don't Look Back series of concerts, where artists are invited to perform one of their albums in its entirety. Isis were asked to perform Oceanic.

As with the rest of the live series, the CD version was self-released, while the album was released on vinyl by Viva Hate Records. Along with all Isis' other live albums, it is set to be re-released on July 26, 2011 in digital format, almost a full year after Isis' dissolution. It marks the fifth and final of the series released to a fortnightly schedule.

Track listing

Personnel
 Aaron Turner – vocals, guitar
 Jeff Caxide – bass guitar
 Michael Gallagher – guitar
 Aaron Harris – drums
 Bryant Clifford Meyer – keyboards and guitar
 Justin Broadrick – mixing, additional guitar on "Weight"
 Nick Zapiello – mastering

References

External links 
 Live V at Bandcamp (streamed copy where licensed)

Isis (band) live albums
2006 live albums